JLA: Act of God is a three issue limited series published by DC Comics under the Elseworlds banner in 2000. It is written by Doug Moench and illustrated by Dave Ross.

The story is a psychological look at what could happen to many superheroes if their powers were taken away by an unseen natural event, and has them pondering whether it is right for them to have powers in the first place.

Plot

On May 23, 2000, an event called the "Black Light" causes all technology on Earth to stop working for a split second - and also permanently robs every superpowered being on the planet of their powers. The cause of the Black Light is never revealed. Heroes  such as the Flash, Green Lantern, and Superman are haunted by their fall from grace: Wally West, formerly the Flash, was unable to save a policeman  from being shot in the head; Clark Kent, formerly Superman, could not stop a dam from bursting and destroying a town; and Kyle Rayner, formerly Green Lantern, was beaten by the supervillain Sonar, an event which drives him to obsession. J'onn Jonzz, the Martian Manhunter, now stuck in his Martian form, questions whether some individuals should have special powers,  and believes the Black Light event happened to teach superheroes that just because they save lives doesn't mean they need powers to do so.  Other depowered heroes, such as Rex Mason, formerly Metamorpho, see this as a turn for the better now that they are human again. Heroes who never had to rely on superpowers, such as Batman, and heroes who use technology such as Steel, Booster Gold, and Blue Beetle, are forced to pick up the slack when criminal activity spikes. 

Meanwhile, the technological supervillains are now in charge of the crime scene, and the only thing in their way is the nonpowered heroes. Toyman launches an assault on LexCorp in a giant robot to try and kill Lex Luthor, and Steel, despite having been critically injured during the Black Light event, tries to stop him. Toyman kills Steel by making his robot stomp on him.  When Booster Gold and Blue Beetle arrive on the scene, Toyman reveals he has other tech-focused supervillains hidden inside the robot and destroys Booster and Beetle's weapons. The tech villains abandon Toyman when the National Guard arrives, because they were paid by Lex Luthor as a doublecross. Toyman is stopped by the combined forces of the National Guard and Hawkman, and Luthor comes down to gloat to Toyman. 

Things are not going well for some of the retired heroes. Clark agrees to split with Lois Lane who is upset at him being a self-loathing drunk, and he later moves in with Diana Prince, formerly Wonder Woman. Green Lantern becomes obsessed with finding a way to defeat Sonar, and Linda Danvers, formerly Supergirl, finds working as a cop insufficient to bring justice to criminals. Natasha Irons finds that someone stripped Steel's lab down to nothing, and Blue Beetle and Booster Gold have had their weapons stolen.

Nearly a year after the Black Light event, Supergirl, at a meeting with Aquaman, Martian Manhunter, and the Flash, brings up the idea of still being heroes despite losing their superpowers. She dubs the former superheroes the Phoenix Group because like the mythical phoenix they plan to rise from the ashes. The four of them begin training with Batman and other non-super heroes. Flash leaves for a while and goes to the Flash Museum, but comes back when he learns that people are forgetting what the heroes meant.

At Zen-Gen Biotech Systems Inc., Ray Palmer, formerly the Atom, signs up for an experiment to regain his ability to shrink, despite the fact that his powers came from a belt. The scientists manage to grant Ray the ability to shrink, but he becomes stuck at six inches and the scientists place him in a dollhouse. While there, he learns the scientists are employed by Lex Luthor and that with this research they can sell superpowers to anyone who can pay. Ray tries to call J'onn, but J'onn cannot hear him because he is still small. He then leaves a message in a table in the dollhouse before he starts shrinking down into the table's subatomic structure, but he starts to grow back too fast and causes a miniature atomic blast, which proves fatal to Ray. Needing more test subjects, Luthor has a group of villains, led by the Joker, kidnap Metamorpho, Booster Gold, and Blue Beetle.

Meanwhile, the Phoenix Group finishes their training, and reveal their new identities. Supergirl is now Justice, Aquaman is now the Hand, Flash is now Red Devil, and Martian Manhunter is now the Green Man. They begin investigating Ray Palmer's death.

Clark leaves Diana when she starts to believe that all that has happened is merely a test from God and that her powers will return when it ends. Clark winds up living on the street, but receives some money in a homeless shelter from a priest. He sees firefighters rescue someone from a burning building, then moves to a secluded home in the woods.

The Phoenix Group and Batman, with help from Oracle, discover the truth behind Atom's death when Justice finds his message on the dollhouse table. They then learn of the abductions of Metamorpho, Booster Gold, and Blue Beetle. The Group, along with Nightwing, head for S.T.A.R. Labs, where the Zen-Gen scientists are currently working. They find the kidnapped heroes and get into a battle with the tech villains. The Group is victorious in its debut, and the villains are arrested along with Lex Luthor.

In a final note, Kyle Rayner faces off against Sonar one last time and soundly defeats the villain, but dies when Sonar impales him on a shaft of wood. Clark goes back to Diana and stops her from killing herself. The two marry, Clark goes back to his job at the Daily Planet, and the Phoenix Group looks toward the future.

Two years later, Clark and Diana have a healthy baby boy who, unbeknown to the two of them, has the ability to transform matter into whatever he wants. With his birth, he opens the door to many possibilities.

Criticism
Reviewers have heavily criticized the irrational characters and severe idiot plot tendencies. The complete destruction of Clark Kent and Lois Lane's relationship was heavily questioned, as was the sudden complete abandonment of both Superman and Wonder Woman's heroics and ideals. The book has also been criticized for elements that seem to glorify Batman and his methods, particularly the sequence where several depowered heroes go to him for guidance to be heroes again. 
Doug Moench’s knowledge on the DC Universe and its characters at the time has also been called into question.

See also
JLA: Created Equal, a similar Elseworlds tale involving a cataclysmic event that strikes Earth.
Decimation, a Marvel Comics event involving the mass depowering of mutants.
List of Elseworlds publications

References

External links

Comics by Doug Moench
Dystopian comics
Fiction set in 2000